Jeromin is a 1953 Spanish historical drama film directed by  Luis Lucia and starring Jaime Blanch, Ana Mariscal and Rafael Durán. It portrays the early life of John of Austria.

Cast
 Jaime Blanch as Don Juan de Austria 'Jeromín'  
 Ana Mariscal as Doña Magdalena de Ulloa  
 Rafael Durán  as Don Luis de Quijada  
 Jesús Tordesillas  as Carlos V  
 Adolfo Marsillach  as Felipe II  
 Antonio Riquelme  as Diego Ruiz  
 Valeriano Andrés  
 Manuel Arbó   
 Francisco Bernal  
 Irene Caba Alba  
 Ana de Leyva  
 Adela Carboné  
 Ramón Elías  
 Casimiro Hurtado  
 Quico Juanes 
 Delia Luna  as Beatriz  
 Arturo Marín 
 Nicolás D. Perchicot  
 Luis Pérez de León  
 José Sepúlveda

References

Bibliography 
 Bentley, Bernard. A Companion to Spanish Cinema. Boydell & Brewer, 2008.

External links 
 

1950s historical drama films
Spanish historical drama films
1953 films
1950s Spanish-language films
Films directed by Luis Lucia
Films set in the 16th century
Cifesa films
Films scored by Juan Quintero Muñoz
Spanish black-and-white films
1950s Spanish films